The 2018–19 Ligue 2 (referred to as the Domino's Ligue 2 for sponsorship reasons) season was the 80th season since its establishment.

Teams

Team changes

Promoted from 2017–18 Championnat National
Red Star
Béziers
Grenoble

Relegated from 2017–18 Ligue 1
Troyes
Metz

Promoted to 2018–19 Ligue 1
Reims
Nîmes

Relegated to 2018–19 Championnat National
Bourg-Péronnas
Quevilly-Rouen
Tours

Stadia and locations

Personnel and kits

Managerial changes

League table

Results

Promotion play-offs
A promotion play-off competition was held at the end of the season, involving the 3rd, 4th and 5th-placed teams in 2018–19 Ligue 2, and the 18th-placed team in 2018–19 Ligue 1.

The quarter-final was played on 21 May and the semi-final was played on 24 May.

Relegation play-offs
A relegation play-off was held at the end of the season between the 18th-placed Ligue 2 team and the 3rd-placed team of 2018–19 Championnat National. This was played over two legs on 28 May and 2 June.

Le Mans won 3–2 on aggregate and were promoted to Ligue 2, while Gazélec Ajaccio were relegated to the Championnat National.

Post-season actions and reprieves
On 12 June 2019, the financial regulator of French football, the DNCG announced that Nancy and Sochaux would be relegated to Championnat National due to their financial position. The decision is appealable, and both teams have indicated that they are appealing. Should one or more of the decisions be upheld at appeal, then Gazélec Ajaccio and Béziers would be reprieved from relegation in that order.

On 25 June 2019, the DNCG announced that AC Ajaccio would also be relegated to Championnat National due to their financial position. The club have indicated they are appealing. If this decision is upheld at appeal in addition to those of Nancy and Sochaux, then Red Star would also be reprieved from relegation.

On 3 July 2019, Nancy successfully appealed the DNCG decision, and will remain in Ligue 2.

On 8 July 2019, it was announced that Sochaux had successfully appealed the DNCG decision, and will remain in Ligue 2.

On 12 July 2019, it was announced that AC Ajaccio would remain in Ligue 2, having been successful in their appeal.

Top scorers

References

External links

 Official site 

Ligue 2 seasons
2
France